Kitione Salawa (born Lautoka, 26 July 1976), is a Fijian former rugby union player, who played as flanker.

Career
He first played for Fiji on 4 July 2003, against Tonga, in Nadi. Salawa was also member of the Fiji squad for the 2003 Rugby World Cup, playing two matches in the tournament, with the match against Scotland, on 1 November 2003, in Sydney as his last match for Fiji.

External links
Kitione Salawa international statistics
Teivovo.com profile
L'équipe profile

1976 births
Living people
Fijian rugby union players
Rugby union flankers
Fiji international rugby union players
Sportspeople from Lautoka